Eospilarctia nehallenia is a moth in the family Erebidae first described by Charles Oberthür in 1911. It is found in Taiwan and China.

The wingspan is 46–51 mm.

Subspecies
Eospilarctia nehallenia nehallenia (Sichuan, Shaanxi, Yunnan)
Eospilarctia nehallenia baibarensis (Matsumura, 1930) (Taiwan)

References

Moths described in 1911
Spilosomina